Temnocinclis is a monotypic genus of sea snails in family Sutilizonidae containing the single species Temnocinclis euripes. This mollusc, a species of slit-limpet that measures up to four millimeters long, lives at hydrothermal vents.

Species
 Temnocinclis euripes McLean, 1989

References

 Geiger D.L. (2012) Monograph of the little slit shells. Volume 1. Introduction, Scissurellidae. pp. 1-728. Volume 2. Anatomidae, Larocheidae, Depressizonidae, Sutilizonidae, Temnocinclidae. pp. 729–1291. Santa Barbara Museum of Natural History Monographs Number 7

Sutilizonidae
Monotypic mollusc genera
Monotypic gastropod genera
Gastropods described in 1989